A&E is an American basic cable network, the flagship television property of A&E Networks. The network was originally founded in 1984 as the Arts & Entertainment Network, initially focusing on fine arts, documentaries, dramas, and educational entertainment. Today, the network deals primarily in non-fiction programming, including reality docusoaps, true crime, documentaries, and miniseries.

As of July 2015, A&E is available to approximately 95,968,000 pay television households (82.4% of households with television) in the United States. The American version of the channel is being distributed in Canada while international versions were launched for Australia, Latin America, and Europe.

History

Launch

A&E launched on February 1, 1984, initially available to 9.3 million cable television homes in the U.S. and Canada. The network is a result of the 1984 merger of Hearst/ABC's Alpha Repertory Television Service (ARTS) and (pre–General Electric merger) RCA-owned The Entertainment Channel.

In 1986, the network premiered one of the first classical music videos to be broadcast in the United States and Canada, the Kendall Ross Bean: Chopin Polonaise in A Flat.

By 1990, original programming accounted for 35 to 40 percent of A&E's content. Biography, a one-hour documentary series that was revived in 1987, was considered to be the network's signature show. In 1994, airings of Biography went from weekly broadcasts to airing five nights a week, which helped boost A&E's ratings to record levels. The nightly series became A&E's top-rated show and one of cable television's most notable successes. Biography received Primetime Emmy Awards in 1999 and 2002.

In 1994, the channel picked up reruns of Law & Order on an eight-year agreement, which would help bring in additional viewers.

In May 1995, the channel's name officially changed to the A&E Network, to reflect its declining focus on arts and entertainment. The following year, the network had branded itself as simply A&E, using the slogans "Time Well Spent" and "Escape the Ordinary." "The word 'arts,' in regard to television, has associations such as 'sometimes elitist,' 'sometimes boring,' 'sometimes overly refined' and 'doesn't translate well to TV,'" Whitney Goit, executive vice president for sales and marketing, stated. "Even the arts patron often finds arts on TV not as satisfying as it should be ... And the word 'entertainment' is too vague. Therefore, much like ESPN uses its letters rather than what they stand for – Entertainment Sports (Programming) Network – we decided to go to just A&E." Of the network's tagline, Goit said, "Intellectually, 'Time well spent' defines a comparison between those who view a lot of television as a wasteland, and their acknowledgment that there are good things on TV and that they'd like to watch more thought-provoking TV."

A&E and Meridian Broadcasting commissioned Horatio Hornblower (1999), winner of two Primetime Emmy Awards, and the seven subsequent dramas in the series; Dash and Lilly (1999), which received nine Emmy nominations; and The Crossing (2000), which won the Peabody Award. The network created two original weekly drama series, Sidney Lumet's 100 Centre Street and Nero Wolfe, both of which lasted from 2001 to 2002.

2002–2013 
In 2002, the contract for Law and Order had expired with the renewal asking price at four times the original per episode fee. Dropping that show allowed the channel to move to more "brand-defining scripted and nonfiction series." That same year, A&E would shift its focus toward reality television in order to attract a younger demographic and cancelled the network's two original scripted series. In May 2003, A&E launched a marketing campaign with the network's new tagline, "The Art of Entertainment." Between 2003 and 2007, the channel gradually retired several long-running series, moving several shows to The Biography Channel and introducing new reality programming.

In 2005, A&E launched their feature film production arm A&E IndieFilms.

The docudrama Flight 93, about the hijacking of the plane which crashed in Pennsylvania during the September 11 attacks, was the most watched program on the network; it attracted 5.9 million viewers for its initial telecast on January 30, 2006. This was later surpassed by Duck Dynasty'''s third season premiere. The previous record-holder for the network was a World War II docudrama, Ike: Countdown to D-Day, starring Tom Selleck and broadcast in 2004, with 5.5 million viewers. A&E later acquired rights to rerun the HBO series The Sopranos; its A&E premiere on January 10, 2007, averaged 3.86 million viewers, making it the most-watched premiere of a rerun off-network series in cable television history at the time. The series continued to perform well for A&E, and led the network to regularly rank in the top ten basic U.S. cable channels in prime time ratings.

On May 26, 2008, in conjunction with the premiere of the original film The Andromeda Strain, A&E rebranded with a new logo and slogan, Real Life. Drama., representing its shift to a more contemporary network with a focus on scripted programming. Additional shows in this major scripted push were drama series The Cleaner and The Beast, which both lasted two seasons. A&E ordered several dramas for Fall 2009, including projects from Jerry Bruckheimer, Shawn Ryan and Lynda Obst, and a Western miniseries from Kevin Costner.

2013–present 
On December 11, 2013, A&E unveiled a new on-air brand identity built around the slogan "Be Original", emphasizing the network's lineup of original productions and positioning it as a "much lighter, more fun place to come and spend time". The success of Duck Dynasty, Bates Motel and Storage Wars put A&E fourth in 2013 among cable channels in the key 18-to-49 age demographic.

On February 20, 2014, A&E Networks UK announced a UK version of the channel to launch on Sky channel 168 on March 24, with a Virgin Media launch date planned for next year. In Spain and Portugal, the channel was launched on October 1, 2014, replacing The Biography Channel in that market.

In 2015, A&E picked up the CBS drama Unforgettable for a fourth season as well as the second season of docuseries Married at First Sight, which will move from sister network FYI. The network also announced the revival of Intervention following its cancellation in 2013.

In October 2016, A&E premiered Live PD, a live series that followed U.S. police departments on patrol in real-time. The show would quickly garner commercial success; in 2018, a survey by Inscape found Live PD to be the most-watched program among non-live (DVR and VOD) and over-the-top viewers in 2018. Live PD was among the most-watched programs on cable television during its run and was credited for allowing A&E to reverse the trend of systematic viewership declines seen across cable television networks.

On January 19, 2017, A&E announced a reboot of Cold Case Files, over a decade after its final season premiered in 2006. A revival of the Biography franchise would also launch on June 28, 2017, with The Notorious Life of Biggie Smalls.

In June 2020, Live PD was cancelled by the network in the wake of protests over the murder of George Floyd, and after reports were confirmed that the show's production staff had recorded and then deleted footage of the killing of Javier Ambler under police custody. A&E over-reliance on the series to fill its schedule resulted in the network losing half of its audience; up until that point, A&E's primetime viewership had been up by 4% year-over-year.

In 2021, A&E began a partnership with the professional wrestling promotion WWE to develop original content chronicling the company's history and performers, including eight episodes of Biography focusing on WWE figures, and WWE's Most Wanted Treasures—a series following Stephanie McMahon and Triple H in their search of wrestling memorabilia. Most Wanted Treasures was A&E's most-watched new series in 2021, while the premiere of a Biography episode on Stone Cold Steve Austin attracted the franchise's highest viewership in 16 years. In 2022, WWE and A&E announced a 24-episode renewal for Most Wanted Treasures, an additional 35 Biography: WWE Legends episodes, and the new series WWE Rivals.

Programming

Notable original series seen on A&E have included Leah Remini: Scientology and the Aftermath, Breakfast with the Arts, The First 48, Duck Dynasty, Intervention, Live PD, Storage Wars, and Wahlburgers.

 Original and co-produced movies and miniseries 

 Pride and Prejudice (1995)
 Emma (1996)
 Jane Eyre (1997)
 The Pale Horse (1997)
 The Ebb-Tide (1998)
 Tess of the D'Urbervilles (1998)
 Hornblower (1998–2003)
 Vanity Fair (1998)
 Murder in a Small Town (1999)
 The Lady in Question  (1999)
 P.T. Barnum (1999)
 The Scarlet Pimpernel (1999)
 Small Vices (1999)
 The Golden Spiders: A Nero Wolfe Mystery (2000)
 The Great Gatsby (2000)
 Longitude (2000)
 Lorna Doone (2000)
 Thin Air (2000)
 The Lost Battalion (2001)
 The Lost World (2001)
 Victoria & Albert (2001)
 Walking Shadow (2001)
 Lathe of Heaven (2002)
 The Magnificent Ambersons (2002)
 Napoléon (2002)
 Shackleton (2002)
 Benedict Arnold: A Question of Honor (2003)
 The Mayor of Casterbridge (2003)
 Murderball (2005)
 Jesus Camp (2006)
 My Kid Could Paint That (2007)
 Cartel Land (2015)
 Life, Animated (2016)

Criticism and controversy
A&E has been criticized for its programming and extreme channel drift from its original focus on the fine arts when it was founded. For example, Maury Chaykin reflected on the cancellation of the A&E original series A Nero Wolfe Mystery in a 2008 interview: "I'm a bit jaded and cynical about which shows succeed on television. I worked on a fantastic show once called Nero Wolfe, but at the time A&E was transforming from the premiere intellectual cable network in America to one that airs Dog the Bounty Hunter on repeat, so it was never promoted and eventually went off the air."

On December 19, 2013, A&E attempted to place Phil Robertson from Duck Dynasty on an indefinite hiatus following remarks on homosexuals in an interview with GQ. A&E said in a statement, "We are extremely disappointed to have read Phil Robertson's comments in GQ, which are based on his own personal beliefs and are not reflected in the series Duck Dynasty. His personal views in no way reflect those of A+E Networks, who have always been strong supporters and champions of the LGBT community." On December 27, 2013, A&E announced they would begin filming again with the entire Robertson family after an outcry from show viewers and discussions with the Robertson family and numerous advocacy groups, a decision itself which resulted in more criticism of the network refusing to stand by its original statement.

The 2014 cancellation of Longmire'' drew viewer backlash over the network citing that the show skewed an older audience as one of the reasons. The series was later picked up by Netflix.

Availability 
A&E is available on Philo, Sling TV, DirecTV Stream, and Frndly TV.

References

External links 

A&E Latin America Site
AETN Corporate Site
Biography
History

A&E Networks
Former General Electric subsidiaries
Television networks in the United States
Former Comcast subsidiaries
Companies based in Manhattan
English-language television stations in the United States
Mass media companies based in New York City
Television channels and stations established in 1984
1984 establishments in the United States